The 1952 Cupa României was the 15th edition of Romania's most prestigious football cup competition.

The title was won by CCA București against Flacăra Ploieşti.

Format
The competition is an annual knockout tournament.

In the first round proper, two pots were made, first pot with Divizia A teams and other teams till 16 and the second pot with the rest of teams qualified in this phase. First pot teams will play away. Each tie is played as a single leg.

If a match is drawn after 90 minutes, the game goes in extra time, and if the scored is still tight after 120 minutes, the team who plays away will qualify.

In case the teams are from same city, there a replay will be played.

In case the teams play in the final, there a replay will be played.

From the first edition, the teams from Divizia A entered in competition in sixteen finals, rule which remained till today.

First round proper

|colspan=3 style="background-color:#FFCCCC;"|7 September 1952

|-
|colspan=3 style="background-color:#FFCCCC;"|10 September 1952

|-
|colspan=3 style="background-color:#FFCCCC;"|11 September 1952

|-
|colspan=3 style="background-color:#FFCCCC;"|25 September 1952

|}

Second round proper

|colspan=3 style="background-color:#FFCCCC;"|1 October 1952

|-
|colspan=3 style="background-color:#FFCCCC;"|2 October 1952

|}

Quarter-finals 

|colspan=3 style="background-color:#FFCCCC;"|15 October 1952

|}

Semi-finals

|colspan=3 style="background-color:#FFCCCC;"|3 December 1952

|}

Final

References

External links
 romaniansoccer.ro
 Official site

Cupa României seasons
Cupa Romaniei
Romania